An election apportionment diagram is the graphic representation of election results and the seats in a plenary or legislative body. The chart can also be used to represent data in easy to understand terms, for example by grouping allied parties together.

Background
Votes in an election are often represented using bar charts or pie charts, often labeled with the corresponding percentage or number of votes. The apportionment of seats between the parties in a legislative body has a defined set of rules, unique to each body. As an example, the Senate of Virginia says, 

Instead of using a bar or pie chart, the apportionment of seats between the parties in a legislative body such as a parliament can be represented more clearly by displaying the individual representatives of each party as dots in a pattern, because the number of representatives is also significant, and is easily understood visually. The dots are typically coded according to the political color of the respective parties. This was traditionally presented as a seating chart of a plenary hall, but can also be represented in a more abstract fashion which more loosely corresponds to the seating arrangement in a legislature, for example a form of half-donut chart as an abstract representation of a hemicycle, or a stylized representation of the Westminster Parliament, showing government, opposition, speaker and crossbenchers.

These charts can also be used to represent data in easy to understand terms. An example of this is politicians’ responses to the Orlando shootings.

Gallery

See also
 Red states and blue states

References

Further reading

External links 

Parliament diagram creation tool
THE HOUSE OF COMMONS AND ITS MEMBERS
House seating plan

Apportionment (politics)
Statistical charts and diagrams